Gaby Clericetti was a French figure skater who competed in ladies singles. She was the 1931-36 French champion.

Results

References
 skatabase

French female single skaters
Year of birth missing
Year of death missing